The Province of Kibuye was, between 2002 and 2006, one of the 12 provinces of Rwanda (known as prefectures before the administrative reform of 2002). Kibuye, Rwanda was the "capital" (or, in certain official Rwandan texts, the "major city").
The territorial reform on 1 January 2006 merged the province with the provinces of Cyangugu and Gisenyi, to create the new Western Province.

See also 
 Provinces of Rwanda

Former provinces of Rwanda